Anita: Dances of Vice   is a 1987 German avant-garde film directed by Rosa von Praunheim.

The film premiered at the 1987 New York Film Festival and was also shown at, for example, the 1988 São Paulo International Film Festival.

Plot
The film follows a delusional elderly woman who believes she is Anita Berber (1899-1928), a German dancer who, along with her partner Sebastian Droste, epitomizes the decadence of 1920s Berlin. Nude dance performances, cocaine use, and an excessive sex life characterize their lifestyle. Anita Berber's story is told through the thoughts and memories of the old lady (played by Lotti Huber) who is being held in an "insane asylum". Scenes from Anita's scandalous life are replayed also in her dreams.

Production notes
The film is in two parts, with all the scenes in the psychiatric ward being shot in black and white and the scenes from Anita's past in color.

Awards
 1987: Nomination for the Gold Hugo at the Chicago International Film Festival 
 1987: Audience Award at the Torino Gay & Lesbian International Film Festival

Reception
"This hit of the New York Film Festival is a study in decadence, madness, and kitsch." (Cleveland International Film Festival) Time Out magazine wrote: "[...] von Praunheim's film, visually astounding and performed with hilarious conviction, is an exhilarating testament to the power of the imagination."

Notes

References

External links

1988 films
West German films
Films directed by Rosa von Praunheim
German biographical films
1980s biographical films
1980s dance films
Films set in the 1910s
Films set in the 1920s
Films set in Berlin
Films shot in Berlin
Biographical films about entertainers
Cultural depictions of dancers
Cultural depictions of actors
Cultural depictions of German women
1980s German films